Loe (Hawaiian: Loe o Maui) was a High Chief in ancient Hawaii. Loe was the sovereign chief of the island of Maui, mentioned in old chants, and ancestor of Kalahumoku II.

Life
Loe was a son of the Chief Kamaloohua by his consort, Kapu of Maui, and thus a grandson of Kuhimana. He followed his father as chief of Maui.

Although war did not occur between Maui and any of the other islands during his reign, there was a disturbance in his father's reign.

He married a woman named Wahaʻakuna, who is mentioned by Samuel Kamakau. She bore him a son named Kahokuohua, who was a King of Molokai island.

Loe is considered to be the great progenitor of the Maui chiefdom. His successor was his grandson, Kaulahea I.

References
The family tree of Loe, Chief of Maui
Abraham Fornander. An Account of the Polynesian Race: Its Origin and Migrations.

Hawaiian monarchs